Wiota may refer to:

Places
United States
Wiota, Iowa, a city
Wiota, Wisconsin, a town
Wiota (community), Wisconsin, an unincorporated community